Martinus Johannes "Martin" van Rooijen (born 31 July 1942) is a Dutch politician of the 50PLUS (50+) party formerly of the defunct Catholic People's Party (KVP) now merged into the Christian Democratic Appeal (CDA) party and businessman. He is the Parliamentary leader of 50PLUS in the Senate and a Member of the Senate since 11 June 2019.

Electoral history

Decorations

References

External links

Official
  Drs. M.J. (Martin) van Rooijen Parlement & Politiek
  Drs. M.J. van Rooijen (50PLUS) Eerste Kamer der Staten-Generaal
  Martin van Rooijen (50PLUS) Tweede Kamer der Staten-Generaal

 

1942 births
Living people
50PLUS politicians
Catholic People's Party politicians
Christian Democratic Appeal politicians
Dutch chief executives in the healthcare industry
Dutch corporate directors
Dutch nonprofit directors
Dutch nonprofit executives
Dutch financial advisors
Dutch financial analysts
Dutch fiscal jurists
Dutch sports executives and administrators
Dutch Roman Catholics
Erasmus University Rotterdam alumni
Knights of the Order of the Netherlands Lion
Members of the Senate (Netherlands)
Members of the House of Representatives (Netherlands)
People from Oegstgeest
People from Heusden
State Secretaries for Finance of the Netherlands
20th-century Dutch civil servants
20th-century Dutch businesspeople
20th-century Dutch economists
20th-century Dutch politicians
21st-century Dutch businesspeople
21st-century Dutch civil servants
21st-century Dutch economists
21st-century Dutch politicians